The following articles contain lists of theme songs:

List of television theme music
List of television theme music composers
List of theme songs in Tales series

See also
Music in professional wrestling, including a list of professional wrestling theme songs